Oberleutnant zur See (OLt zS or OLZS in the German Navy, Oblt.z.S. in the Kriegsmarine) is traditionally the highest rank of Lieutenant in the German Navy. It is grouped as OF-1 in NATO.

The rank was introduced in the Imperial German Navy by renaming the former rank of Premier Lieutenant in 1890. Within the navy officers of this rank were simply addressed as Herr Oberleutnant. To distinguish naval officers from those of the army, the suffix zur See (at sea) was added in official communications, sometimes shortened to z.S. (Oblt.z.S.). The rank has since been used by the Reichsmarine, Kriegsmarine, and Bundesmarine.  In the Volksmarine the rank was originally used in the same way until the suffix zur See was dropped. In the Kriegsmarine engineers (Ingenieur – Ing.) of the same rank were distinguished as Oberleutnant (Ing.).

See also
 Ranks of the German Bundeswehr
 Rank insignia of the German Bundeswehr

References

Naval ranks of Germany